The March for Science was a series of rallies held on Earth Day in 2017. March for Science may also refer to:

March for Science Portland
March for Science 2018